The Greece national rugby league team (Greek: Ελλάδα εθνική ομάδα ράγκμπι λίγκ) represents Greece in rugby league. The team has been participating in international competition since 2003, and have qualified for their first Rugby League World Cup, to be held in 2022.

Administered by the Greek Rugby League Association since 2017, the team is coached by Greek Australian Steve Georgallis and captained by Jordan Meads.

History

Early years (2003–12)

Greek Rugby League was first formed in Australia by Australians with Greek heritage. The founder of the Greek Rugby League was Kostadino Mylonas.

The team, nicknamed 'The Titans' first played international fixtures in 2003. Greece played a warm-up match against New Caledonia in late August winning the encounter 10–26. In September of that year, the Greece national team played their debut RLIF sanctioned game against Italy in September. The game was played in Australia at Jubilee Oval for the inaugural Ionio Cup. Greece were narrowly defeated 26–24.

In October 2005, Greece played an international match in Australia against Malta which they lost 24 points to 22 in front of an estimated crowd of 6,500. Greece then played a warm up match against Fiji A at OKI Jubilee Stadium in front of 1103 spectators. Fiji, who had just qualified for the 2008 Rugby League World Cup, won the match 34–12.

On 28 October 2006, Greece played Serbia in the debut international match on Greek soil. Greece, supported by Greek-heritage players from Australia, won 44–26 in front of 150 home fans of the Glyka Nera Football Club, Athens. Greece were coached by former Western Suburbs Magpies player Steve Georgallis.

Greece won their first ever Rugby League Championship in 2009 when they won the Australian Mediterranean Shield, defeating Italy in the Final 34–14. This was the first competition that the Greek side had competed in. The Greeks were captained by Wests Tigers player John Skandalis. Greece did not qualify for the 2008 Rugby League World Cup.

Domestic federation founded (2013–16)
2013 saw the creation of a domestic Rugby League competition in Greece. This competition was originally governed by the Hellenic Federation of Rugby League (HFRL).

On 27 October 2013 Greece defeated Hungary 90–0 in an international match played in Budapest in front of 500 spectators. The Greek side featured a mixture of players from the Greek domestic competition (8) and Australian-based (9) players including Braith Anasta and Michael Korkidas. Anasta kicked 15 goals from 15 attempts and scored 46 points in the win.

In October 2014, Greece were crowned European Championship C champions after beating Czech Republic in the final. This was their second international tournament victory

Later in the same month, Greece competed in the inaugural Balkans Cup tournament held in Serbia. They beat the hosts in the final to win their third international tournament to add to their trophy cabinet, second in over a week.

Matthew Ashill was the coach of the team for the 2015 European C/2017 Rugby League World Cup qualifying tournament and on 13 September 2015 he named a 22-man train-on squad with only domestic club players which caused controversy as it was a key event coming up for the national rugby league team. He explained his decision saying "We have a totally new plan using just domestic players who will contribute to the growth and development of the sport here".

In April 2016, the HFRL was suspended from the Rugby League European Federation (RLEF) following a year-long investigation for "wilfully acting in a manner prejudicial to the interests of the RLEF and international rugby league." The HRFL was expelled from the RLEF in August 2016 for failing to meet membership requirements.

New administration, 2021 World Cup qualification (2017– )
In March 2017, the Greek Rugby League Association (GRLA) was recognised by the RLEF as the official governing body for rugby league in Greece, gaining observer status. In March 2018 the GRLA were rewarded for what the RLEF described as "significant progress rebuilding the national governing body and revamping its competition structure, with the support of the Greek Australian community" by being granted affiliate status.

In September 2018, Greece began their qualification path for the 2021 Rugby League World Cup by winning the European Championship C South conference. They defeated Ukraine 28–26 at Dynamo Stadium (Kharkiv) and Malta Rugby League 60–4 at Glyka Nera Stadium, Athens.

In May 2019, Greece faced European Championship C North conference winners Norway at New River Stadium, London, in the European Championship C decider. The match served as a curtain raiser to the League 1 round 9 fixture between London Skolars and Doncaster, Greece defeated Norway 56–26 to progress to the final stages of World Cup qualifiers.

In November 2019, Greece qualified for the 2021 Rugby League World Cup after participating in the final round of European World Cup Qualifiers in Pool B with matches against Scotland and Serbia. Greece were unable to host their designated match against Scotland, as the Greek state did not recognise the Greek Rugby League Association. Instead, the match was played in London at New River Stadium on 1 November. Greece were defeated 42–24.

The remaining match in Pool B saw Greece play Serbia, with the winners advancing to the 2021 Rugby League World Cup. Greece defeated Serbia 82–6 at Makiš Stadium, Belgrade.

On 16 January 2020, Greece were drawn into Group A of the 2021 Rugby League World Cup with England, Samoa and France.

They then entered the 2020 European Championship B where they were due to play against Russia and Serbia.

As of July 2022, the Greek state announced its recognition of the Greek Rugby League Association and that games are free to take place on home soil without intervention.

Greece started their 2021 Rugby League World Cup campaign with a 34-12 loss against France in Doncaster. This was followed by a 72-4 loss against Samoa. In their final group stage match, Greece suffered their worst ever defeat losing to England 94-4 at Bramall Lane in Sheffield.

Current squad
Squad selected for the 2021 Rugby League World Cup:

Notable players

Since rugby league has been known to the nation of Greece since the 2000s many players of Greek birth or heritage have gone on to attain notability in representing either Greece, other nations, or appearing in major domestic leagues around the world, some notable Greek Rugby League Players include:

Results

All-time record for Greece's national side as of 29 October 2022.

A red box around the year indicates tournaments played within Greece

World Cup

Balkans Cup

Australian Mediterranean Shield
The Australian Mediterranean Shield tournament is a tournament involving affiliate and observer European nations competing against each other for more international rugby league experience. Greece beat Portugal by 42-16 and therefore advanced to the final to take on Italy. They won the final by a score of 34–14 to be crowned the champions, the country's first International rugby league title.

Emerging Nations World Championship

European Championship B

European Championship C

Records

Most Capped Players

Top Try Scorers

Top Point Scorers 

Source:

See also

 Rugby league in Greece
 Greece national rugby league team (women)
 Greek Rugby League Association
 Hellas Rugby League Federation

References

External links

National rugby league teams
Rugby league team
Rugby league in Greece